The 1987–88 Notre Dame Fighting Irish men's basketball team represented the University of Notre Dame during the 1987-88 college basketball season. The Irish were led by head coach Digger Phelps, in his 17th season, and played their home games at the Joyce Center in Notre Dame, Indiana. Notre Dame earned an at-large bid to the NCAA tournament where they fell in the opening round to SMU. The team finished with a 20–9 record.

Roster

Schedule and results

|-
!colspan=9 style=| Regular Season

|-
!colspan=9 style=| NCAA Tournament

Rankings

References

Notre Dame Fighting Irish men's basketball seasons
Notre Dame
Notre Dame
Notre Dame Fighting Irish
Notre Dame Fighting Irish